Erzulie nennen O, also known simply as Erzulie, is a song composed at age 14 by the Haitian singer Kandjo (1879-1947), also known as Auguste de Pradines. Erzulie is often said to be one of his most beloved songs. Composed in the 1890s, the song continued to be played as "part of the Haitian folkloric repertory" at the end of the 20th century, more than 100 years after its composition.

Origins
Erzulie was composed in honor of Erzulie Freda, a well-known female lwa (Vodou deity), in gratitude for healing.
The teenager Auguste de Pradines was in need of healing because at 9 years of age, while living in France with his father, the child Auguste had been diagnosed with polio. His family followed physician recommendations and returned him to Haiti, where he was homeschooled.
Five years later, at the age of 14, when due to his polio Auguste had no control over the left part of his body, he was "carried on his back" to

Notable performances
In 1995, Erzulie was performed as part of the Bouyon Rasin ("Roots Soup") Festival. The song was performed in two-part harmony by Emerante Morse and Martha Jean-Claude

References

External links
 Erzulie nennen O (3:26) rendition by  RAM
 Erzulie nennen O (2:58) rendition in 1953 by L'orchestre Des Casernes Dessalines
 Ezili O (Erzulie nennen O) translation of lyrics and interpretation

1890s songs
Haitian folk songs